Demushbo (Dëmushbo), or ambiguously Remo, is an extinct Panoan language of the Brazilian Amazon basin, near the Peruvian border.

References

Indigenous languages of Western Amazonia
Panoan languages
Extinct languages of South America